Silas Araújo da Silva (born 30 May 1996), commonly known as Silas, is a Brazilian footballer who plays as a midfielder for Barra-SC.

Career
Silas is a product of Atlético Progresso Clube and Sport Club Internacional youth sportive systems.

In May 2017 he signed a 2 years deal with the Ukrainian Premier League's FC Zorya Luhansk.

Honours
CSA
Campeonato Alagoano: 2021

References

External links
Profile at Zerozero 

1996 births
Living people
People from Pelotas
Brazilian footballers
Association football midfielders
Brazilian expatriate footballers
Sport Club Internacional players
Expatriate footballers in Ukraine
Expatriate footballers in Israel
Expatriate footballers in Belarus
Brazilian expatriate sportspeople in Ukraine
Brazilian expatriate sportspeople in Israel
Brazilian expatriate sportspeople in Belarus
FC Zorya Luhansk players
Hapoel Ironi Kiryat Shmona F.C. players
FC Dinamo Minsk players
Centro Sportivo Alagoano players
Guarani FC players
Ukrainian Premier League players
Israeli Premier League players
Campeonato Brasileiro Série B players
Sportspeople from Rio Grande do Sul